is a former Japanese football player.

Playing career
Kizawa was born in Koga on June 2, 1969. After graduating from high school, he joined Japan Soccer League club Furukawa Electric (later JEF United Ichihara) in 1988. He became a regular player as right side back from 1990. In 1992, Japan Soccer League was folded and founded new league J1 League. However his opportunity to play decreased from 1992. In 1995, he moved to newly was promoted to J1 League club, Cerezo Osaka. He played many matches as regular right side back. In 1999, he moved to Albirex Niigata which was promoted to new league J2 League. In 2001, he moved to his local club Mito HollyHock. He retired end of 2004 season.

Club statistics

References

External links

Mito HollyHock

1969 births
Living people
Association football people from Ibaraki Prefecture
Japanese footballers
Japan Soccer League players
J1 League players
J2 League players
JEF United Chiba players
Cerezo Osaka players
Albirex Niigata players
Mito HollyHock players
Association football defenders